Nullotitan (meaning "Nullo's giant", in honor of paleontologist Francisco Nullo) is a genus of lithostrotian titanosaur from the Chorrillo Formation from Santa Cruz Province in Argentina. The type and only species is Nullotitan glaciaris. It was a contemporary of the ornithopod Isasicursor which was described in the same paper.

Discovery and naming 

In 1980, geologist Francisco E. Nullo noticed the presence of sauropod bones on a hillside of the Estancia Alta Vista, south of the Centinela River in the Santa Cruz province of Argentina. He reported these finds to then-prominent paleontologist José Bonaparte. Bonaparte dug up a large cervical vertebra in 1981 and reported it as a cf. Antarctosaurus. The old site was relocated and new excavations were carried out between 13 and 17 January and 14 to 19 March 2019, and a new site was discovered on the Estancia La Anita.

In 2019, the type species Nullotitan glaciaris was named and described by Fernando Emilio Novas, Federico Lisandro Agnolin, Sebastián Rozadilla, Alexis Mauro Aranciaga-Rolando, Federico Brisson-Egli, Matias Javier Motta, Mauricio Cerroni, Martín Dario Ezcurra, Agustín Guillermo Martinelli, Julia S. D´Angelo, Gerardo Alvarez -Herrera, Adriel Roberto Gentil, Sergio Bogan, Nicolás Roberto Chimento, Jordi Alexis García-Marsà, Gastón Lo Coco, Sergio Eduardo Miquel, Fátima F. Brito, Ezequiel Ignacio Vera, Valeria Susana Perez Loinaze, Mariela Soledad Fernández and Leonardo Salgado. The large number of authors is a consequence of the fact that the article described the entire fauna in which every expert contributed his part. The genus name honors Nullo and links his name to a Greek "titan", referring to the large race of powerful giants, the Titans of Greek mythology. The species designation refers to the Perito Moreno Glacier that is visible from the site.

The holotype, MACN-PV 18644; MPM 21542, is found in a layer of the lower Chorrillo Formation that dates from the Campanian-Maastrichtian. It consists of a partial skeleton without a skull. The following are preserved: a third cervical vertebra (the MACN-PV 18644 specimen found by Bonaparte in 1981), tail vertebrae, a neck rib, ribs, a left shoulder blade, the ends of a right thigh bone, a right shin, a right calf bone, and a right ankle bone. These bones were found scattered but were believed to represent one individual.

In addition, various specimens were allocated. MPM 21545 is a patchy skeleton of which only a humerus, a rib and a vertebra are found. It was a hundred meters from the holotype and higher on the slope so that it is probably another individual that is also clearly smaller than the type specimen. MPM 21546 consists of separate rear tail vertebrae. MPM 21547 consists of a series of five middle tail vertebrae found in a different position. These have not yet been excavated. MPM 21548 has been found in a different position and consists of a left shin. A few meters away lay specimen MPM 21549, a front central vertebra. Eggshells and teeth of sauropods are also stored in this position. No osteoderms have been found anywhere. The fossils are part of the collection Museo Regional Provincial "Padre Molina", with the exception of the original cervical vertebra that is kept in the Museo Argentino de Ciencias Naturales "Bernardino Rivadavia".

Description

Size and distinctive features 
Nullotitan is a huge sauropod.

The descriptors were able to identify some distinguishing features. Two of them are autapomorphies, unique derived properties. The anterior and middle tail vertebrae have sides and undersides that are eroded by numerous large depressions that do not pierce the bone wall. From the front or rear, the fibula has a striking, wavy bend.

In addition, there is a unique combination of characteristics that are not unique in themselves. The vertebral bodies of the anterior tail vertebrae are remarkably short, twice as wide across as horizontally long. At the middle tail vertebrae there is a large trough on the side that is covered from above by the side protrusion. The tail vertebrae are not pneumatized. The middle tail vertebrae have a deep longitudinal trough on the underside bounded by two thick ridges. The lower end of the tibia is flattened from the front to the rear and widened more across than with other titanosaurs.

Skeleton 
The side is pierced by a large oval pleurocoel. The bottom is flat. The bone has many small air chambers internally, known as camellae.

The anterior tail vertebrae have an oval anterior facet. The sides slope down steeply. The side projections are high and flattened from front to back. The first tail vertebra is approximately twenty-five centimeters long and forty wide. The hollows on the sides are randomly distributed, separated by ridges. They are elongated and run lengthwise. Perhaps there were epaxial tendons anchored in it, holding the tail up. The middle tail whirls are square in side view, have a convex cotyle at the back, a deep longitudinal trough on the underside, numerous but shallower recesses, and short conical side protrusions placed at the middle height. The Musculus caudofemoralis, the large retractor muscle that pulled the femur backwards, continued to the sixteenth vertebra. The procoal posterior tail vertebrae are elongated, flattened and with a conical cotyle.

The shoulder blade shows few details. There is a bump on the inside, above the level of the acromial process, close to the front and top edges. On the inside there is also a protrusion on the bottom edge.

It is relatively slim, with a robustness index (RI) of 2.8. The delta-detectoral comb is relatively short with the lower edge at a quarter of the shaft length measured from above, a basic characteristic.

The femur has lower joint nodules that are about the same size. It is robust and extremely wide at the bottom. It is robust with an RI of 0.4 but not extreme. The shaft bolt outwards. The ends are strongly widened from front to back. The upper surface runs horizontally. The leg has a low rising branch and a strong widening inside.

Phylogeny 
Nullotitan was placed within the Titanosauria in the Colossosauria in 2019, although its precise relationships remain unclear.

Notes

References 

Titanosaurs
Campanian life
Maastrichtian life
Late Cretaceous dinosaurs of South America
Cretaceous Argentina
Fossil taxa described in 2019